Sadid or Sedid may refer to:
 Sedid, Razavi Khorasan
 Sadid, South Khorasan
 Sadid Industrial Group, Iranian industrial conglomerate
 Sadid Hossain, Bangladeshi cricketer
 Sadid al-Din al-Kazaruni (fl. 14th century), Persian physician
 Sadid Mibzal, Bangladeshi Calligrapher